"The World Next Door" is the third segment of the twenty-eighth episode (the fourth episode of the second season (1986–87)) of the television series The Twilight Zone. In this segment, an eccentric inventor simultaneously lives in two different universes.

Plot
Barney Schlessinger spends his free time in his basement as a part-time inventor. His inventions are imaginative but impractical, such as a mechanical flower and a "mouse missile" that eliminates pests by splattering their guts all over the vicinity. His wife Katy is not supportive and says that he should concentrate on his job. His friend Milton says he is "just out of step - a man with bad timing." Barney has waking dreams of an alternate reality in which technology and social norms have all either not advanced beyond early 19th century norms or gone in different directions. In this reality he is a wealthy and famous business tycoon, having partnered with Milton to ply his inventions for profit. These dreams feel as real as his normal life and occupy an increasingly large percentage of his waking hours, as if he lives two different lives simultaneously.

While tidying up the basement under a firm ultimatum from Katy, Barney accidentally destroys a bookshelf with the mouse missile and discovers a door behind it. He opens the door and finds himself in the wine cellar of an adjacent house. His appearance has changed to look like his alternate self. Upstairs, he rejoins a party. At the party, Barney discovers his counterpart has confided in Milton's counterpart that he has reciprocal dreams to the ones Barney has, and longs for Barney's freedom from the trappings of wealth and fame. The party guests leave during a storm. Katy (a stranger to him in this world) appears at his doorstep looking for help after her horse and carriage have run off.

Barney and Katy get to know each other. In this alternate world she is impressed with him and his career choice. Barney runs back to the wine cellar to retrieve the mechanical flower from his own world. He discovers the counterpart has cleaned the basement and is being doted on by Katy. Barney and his counterpart exchange knowing glances and he shuts the door after wishing his counterpart good luck. Barney gives the alternate Katy the flower as a gift.

External links
 

The Twilight Zone (1985 TV series season 2) episodes
1986 American television episodes
Television episodes about parallel universes

fr:Jardin secret (La Cinquième Dimension)